Premosello-Chiovenda is a comune (municipality) in the Province of Verbano-Cusio-Ossola in the Italian region Piedmont, located about  northeast of Turin and about  northwest of Verbania.

Premosello-Chiovenda borders the following municipalities: Anzola d'Ossola, Beura-Cardezza, Cossogno, Mergozzo, Ornavasso, Pieve Vergonte, San Bernardino Verbano, Trontano, Vogogna. The original name, Premosello, was changed in 1959 in memory of local jurist Giuseppe Chiovenda.

References

External links
 Official website

Cities and towns in Piedmont